Ottmarsheim is a commune in the Haut-Rhin department in Alsace in north-eastern France. It lies on the river Rhine and on the A36 autoroute, 14 km east of Mulhouse. Its octagonal parish church was the church of the former Benedictine abbey of Saint Mary, and dates from the early 11th century.

Populated places 
 Grunhutte

See also
 Communes of the Haut-Rhin department
 Ottonian architecture

References

Communes of Haut-Rhin
Romanesque architecture in France